Vila Vila is a location in the Cochabamba Department in central Bolivia. It is the seat of the Vila Vila Municipality, the second municipal section of the Mizque Province.

References 

  Instituto Nacional de Estadistica de Bolivia  (INE)

Populated places in Cochabamba Department